The kan is a traditional unit of measurement used in Korean architecture still found in use today primarily to describe palaces, Buddhist temples and shrines, and Confucian school buildings, from the Joseon era. A Kan is the distance between two support beams or pillars. 1 Kan is defined as being a space of about two meters, or 6–8 feet. Kan is also used to define an area in a traditional building, referring to the square space enclosed by 4 wooden pillars.

See also
 Korean units
 Ken, its Japanese equivalent

References

Architecture in Korea
Units of length